IGN (formerly Imagine Games Network) is an entertainment website that focuses on video games, films, music and other media.

IGN may also refer to:

National mapping institutes 
 Institut géographique national, the French national geographic institute, now called Institut national de l'information géographique et forestière
 Instituto Geográfico Nacional (Guatemala), the Guatemalan national geographic institute
 Instituto Geográfico Nacional (Spain), the Spanish national geographic institute
 Nationaal Geografisch Instituut - Institut Géographique National, the Belgian national geographic institute, often referred to by the abbreviation "IGN" in Walloon and "NGI" in Flemish

Other uses
 Imperial German Navy, navy for the German Empire from 1871 to 1919
 Intergovernmental Negotiations framework, a process to reform the United Nations Security Council
 International-Great Northern Railroad (I&GN), a railroad in the US state of Texas
 Iodine Global Network, a nonprofit organization
 Maria Cristina Airport, serving the general area of Iligan, Mindanao, Philippines, IATA airport code IGN

See also
 IGE (Internet Gaming Entertainment), an MMORPG services company